The women's team sabre competition at the 2015 European Games in Baku was held on 27 June at the Crystal Hall 3.

Results

Final standing

References

External links

Women's team sabre